Fit Right In may refer to:

 "Fit Right In" (Debbie Harry song), 2008 
 "Fit Right In", 2019 song from My Little Pony: Friendship Is Magic
 "Fit Right In", 2021 song from My Little Pony: A New Generation